The lesser racket-tailed drongo (Dicrurus remifer) is a species of bird in the family Dicruridae. It is found in the Indian Subcontinent and Southeast Asia.

It is found in the Indian Subcontinent and Southeast Asia, ranging across Bangladesh, Bhutan, Cambodia, India, Indonesia, Laos, Malaysia, Myanmar, Nepal, Thailand, and Vietnam. Its natural habitat is near the edge or inside of subtropical or tropical moist montane forests.

Description 

The drongo is about 25–27·5 cm long, excluding outermost tail feathers (c. 30–40 cm to end of tail); average weight of males is between 39–49 grams while females are between 35·5–44 grams. Its feathers are black with a bluish metallic gloss.

It can be confused with the greater racket-tailed drongo, but the latter doesn't have a crest on head and its tail is square cut.

Taxonomy 
There are 4 recognised subspecies of lesser racket-tailed drongo:

 D. r. tectirostris (Hodgson, 1836) – lower Himalayas from N India (Uttarakhand) E to Arunachal Pradesh, Assam, Nagaland, Manipur and Mizoram, NE Bangladesh, S China (SE Xizang, W & S Yunnan and SW Guangxi), Myanmar (except extreme S), N Thailand, N Laos and N Vietnam (S to Huê).
 D. r. peracensis (E. C. S. Baker, 1918) – S Myanmar (Tenasserim) and SW & S Thailand S to N Peninsular Malaysia (S Selangor and S Pahang), S Laos and S Vietnam (S to S Annam).
 D. r. lefoli (Delacour & Jabouille, 1928) – mountains of S Cambodia (Cardamom and Elephant Ranges).
 D. r. remifer (Temminck, 1823) – Sumatra (Barisan Range and Batak Highlands) and W Java.

References

External links 

lesser racket-tailed drongo
Birds of North India
Birds of Nepal
Birds of Eastern Himalaya
Birds of Southeast Asia
Birds of Yunnan
lesser racket-tailed drongo
Taxonomy articles created by Polbot